The Picos Volcanic Fissural System is a system of scoria cones that build up the central region of the island of São Miguel (between Sete Cidades and Água de Pau volcanoes). This volcano is very young with most of it only 5000 years old. The only recorded eruption was in 1652, but seven other eruptions have taken place in the cinder cone group in the last 10,000 years.

History
This volcanic system is the most recently formed on the island of São Miguel, with its eruptive history dominated by Hawaiian, basaltic and Stromboli phases.

In the last 5000 years, there have been approximately 30 eruptions, with the most recent events occurring with recorded human history.

The first, in 1563, succeeded a  Phreatoplinian eruption centring on the volcano of Água de Pau. During this 1563 eruption, known as the Pico do Sapateiro or Queimado, basalt lava flows reached as far as Ribeira Seca, in the north coast. The second eruption, which started on 19 October 1652, resulted in the formation of three Trachyte domes and involved explosive phases of Vulcanian eruptions, by the time the eruptions end on 26 October 1652. This, more recent eruption, was a markedly eruptive/explosive event, composed of evolved magma that generally does not characterize the Picos region.

Geography
The landscape is dominated by the presence of approximately 300 monogenic cones, composed of scoria and lava flows. Similarly, the area is punctuated by maars, pumice cones and lava domes, in particular in the transitional zones between the adjacent central volcanoes.

The volcanostratigraphy of magmas/lava flows of the region include deposits between 2200 and 2800 years B.C., while radiometric deposits from the principal areas of population (Ponta Delgada) are from 12300 B.C.

References
Notes

Sources
 
 
 
 

Geology of the Azores
São Miguel Island